Senator Hardy may refer to:

Joe Hardy (politician) (born 1949), Nevada State Senate
Paul Hardy (born 1942), Louisiana State Senate
Randall Hardy (born 1951), Kansas State Senate
Warren Hardy (born 1963), Nevada State Senate